The Racine Belles were a minor league baseball team based in Racine, Wisconsin that played between 1909 and 1914 in the Wisconsin-Illinois League and in 1915 in the Bi-State League.

References

External links
Baseball Reference

Defunct minor league baseball teams
Baseball teams established in 1909
Baseball teams disestablished in 1915
Wisconsin-Illinois League teams
Bi-State League teams
Professional baseball teams in Wisconsin
1909 establishments in Wisconsin
1915 disestablishments in Wisconsin
Defunct baseball teams in Wisconsin
Wisconsin State League teams